Moshnitskoye is a rural locality (a village) in Semizerye  Rural Settlement, Kaduysky District, Vologda Oblast, Russia. The population was 2 as of 2002.

Geography 
Moshnitskoye is located 35 km northwest of Kaduy (the district's administrative centre) by road. Maza is the nearest rural locality.

References 

Rural localities in Kaduysky District